The Vargas Diamond, discovered in Brazil on August 13, 1938 (July 1938 according to Ball & Kerr) by Joaquim Venancio Tiago and Manoel Miguel Domingues, was  when pulled out of the ground. Twenty-nine smaller diamonds were carved from the larger rough Vargas Diamond including the  emerald cut diamond named "President Vargas", after the former Brazilian President, Getúlio Vargas.

The diamond has been in the possession of Harry Winston, a jeweler from New York.

See also
List of largest rough diamonds
List of diamonds

Further reading
 Esmaraldo Reis (1940) Three Large Brazilian Diamonds, pp.  2-3 Gemological Institute of America, USA, Vol. 3, No. 6 (Summer 1940)
 Shipley, Robert M. (1944) Gemological Digest: Additional Notes on the President Vargas Diamond, pp.  168-169 (PDF page 12–13) Gemological Institute of America, USA, Vol. 4, No. 11 (Fall 1944)

References

1938 in Brazil
Diamonds originating in Brazil
Individual diamonds